In Greek mythology, the name Eleuther (Ancient Greek: Ἑλευθήρ) may refer to:

Eleuther, one of the Curetes, was said to have been the eponym of the towns Eleutherae and Eleuthernae in Crete.
Eleuther, an Arcadian prince as one of the 50 sons of the impious King Lycaon either by the naiad Cyllene, Nonacris or by unknown woman. He and his brother Lebadus were the only not guilty of the abomination prepared for Zeus, and fled to Boeotia.
Eleuther, a variant of the name Eleutherios, early Greek god who was the son of Zeus and probably an alternate name of Dionysus.
Eleuther, son of Apollo and Aethusa. He is renowned for having an excellent singing voice, which earned him a victory at the Pythian games, and for having been the first to erect a statue of Dionysus, as well as for having given his name to Eleutherae. His sons were Iasius (Iasion) and Pierus. He also had several daughters, who spoke impiously of the image of Dionysus wearing a black aegis, and were driven mad by the god; as a remedy, Eleuther, in accordance with an oracle, established a cult of "Dionysus of the Black Aegis".

Notes

References 

 Apollodorus, The Library with an English Translation by Sir James George Frazer, F.B.A., F.R.S. in 2 Volumes, Cambridge, MA, Harvard University Press; London, William Heinemann Ltd. 1921. . Online version at the Perseus Digital Library. Greek text available from the same website.
 Dionysus of Halicarnassus, Roman Antiquities. English translation by Earnest Cary in the Loeb Classical Library, 7 volumes. Harvard University Press, 1937-1950. Online version at Bill Thayer's Web Site
 Dionysius of Halicarnassus, Antiquitatum Romanarum quae supersunt, Vol I-IV. . Karl Jacoby. In Aedibus B.G. Teubneri. Leipzig. 1885. Greek text available at the Perseus Digital Library.
 Gaius Julius Hyginus, Fabulae from The Myths of Hyginus translated and edited by Mary Grant. University of Kansas Publications in Humanistic Studies. Online version at the Topos Text Project.
Lucius Mestrius Plutarchus, Moralia with an English Translation by Frank Cole Babbitt. Cambridge, MA. Harvard University Press. London. William Heinemann Ltd. 1936. Online version at the Perseus Digital Library. Greek text available from the same website.
 Pausanias, Description of Greece with an English Translation by W.H.S. Jones, Litt.D., and H.A. Ormerod, M.A., in 4 Volumes. Cambridge, MA, Harvard University Press; London, William Heinemann Ltd. 1918. . Online version at the Perseus Digital Library
 Pausanias, Graeciae Descriptio. 3 vols. Leipzig, Teubner. 1903. Greek text available at the Perseus Digital Library.
 Stephanus of Byzantium, Stephani Byzantii Ethnicorum quae supersunt, edited by August Meineike (1790-1870), published 1849. A few entries from this important ancient handbook of place names have been translated by Brady Kiesling. Online version at the Topos Text Project.
 Suida, Suda Encyclopedia translated by Ross Scaife, David Whitehead, William Hutton, Catharine Roth, Jennifer Benedict, Gregory Hays, Malcolm Heath Sean M. Redmond, Nicholas Fincher, Patrick Rourke, Elizabeth Vandiver, Raphael Finkel, Frederick Williams, Carl Widstrand, Robert Dyer, Joseph L. Rife, Oliver Phillips and many others. Online version at the Topos Text Project.

Princes in Greek mythology
Sons of Lycaon
Children of Apollo
Children of Zeus
Demigods in classical mythology
Arcadian characters in Greek mythology
Arcadian mythology